The first edition of the Merdeka Tournament was held in August and September 1957 in Malaya (now Malaysia). It was won by Hong Kong League XI. Singapore won a consolation tournament for teams that did not qualify for the final round.

First round

A series of knockout ties was held to determine which teams would compete in the second round. The match between South Vietnam and Singapore required a replay as the score was level at the end of the first match.

First Round Replay

Second round

The winning teams from the first round played a series of matches against one another. The team finishing top of the group was the tournament winner.

Consolation Tournament

The losing teams from the first round played a series of matches against one another as a consolation tournament. The team finishing top of the group was the winner of this tournament.

Goalscorers

7 goals
 Peter Corthine

6 goals
 Abdul Ghani Minhat
 Duc

5 goals
 Omo Suratmo
 Law Kwok Tai

Notes

1. One source (P.S.S.I, "Kenang-Kenangan P.S.S.I. 50th 19 April 1930 – 19 April 1980", 1980.) report this match as a 4–2 victory to Malaya.

References

Merdeka Cup
Merd
Merd
Merd